Ridley may refer to:

Education
 Ridley College, a university preparatory boarding and day school located in St. Catharines, Ontario, Canada
 Ridley College (Melbourne), an evangelical theological college in Melbourne, Australia
 Ridley Hall, Cambridge, a theological college in the evangelical tradition of the Church of England (named for the martyr bishop Nicholas)
 Ridley School District, in Pennsylvania, United States
 Ridley High School, in Folsom, Pennsylvania, United States

Entertainment
 Ridley (Metroid), a recurring antagonist from the Metroid video game series
 Ridley Jones, an American animated television series
 Ridley Silverlake, the female protagonist in the PS2 game Radiata Stories
 Ridley (TV series), a 2022 British television crime drama series

Places
 Ridley, Cheshire, England, United Kingdom, a civil parish
 Ridley, Kent, England, United Kingdom, a place and former civil parish
 Ridley, Northumberland, England, United Kingdom, a hamlet; see List of United Kingdom locations: Ri-Ror § Ri
 Ridley Township, Delaware County, Pennsylvania, United States

Other
 Ridley (name), a surname and given name, with a list of people of this name
 Ridley Bikes, a Belgian bicycle brand
 Ridley Inc., a manufacturer and marketer of livestock products
 Viscount Ridley, a title in the UK Peerage created in 1900 for Matthew Ridley, 1st Viscount Ridley

See also
 
 Ridley's (disambiguation)
 Ridleyi

English toponymic surnames